Dashan Island ( or  or ) is an island of Shandong province, China.

The island has an area of 0.115 km², and is one of the islands in the Qiansan Islands.

Dashan Island is one of the baselines of the Chinese territorial sea.

In 2006, PLA erected the Territorial sea steles on Dashan Island. (China)

See also
Suyanjiao (Suyan Rock)
Macaiheng
Waikejiao
Haijiao
Baselines of the Chinese territorial sea

References

External links
 Declaration of the Government of the People's Republic of China on the baselines of the territorial sea(May15th, 1996)
中国东海１０座领海基点石碑建成
中华人民共和国政府关于中华人民共和国领海基线的声明(1996年5月15日)

Islands of Jiangsu
Baselines of the Chinese territorial sea
Islands of the Yellow Sea